Josef Chloupek (22 April 1908 – 11 January 1974) was an Austrian footballer who played in the late 1920s and 1930s. He played as a defender.

Chloupek played his youth football by Floridsdorfer AC and joined their first team in 1927. He played for them until 1931 and then moved to FC Zürich. A year later he moved onto FC Basel. But because he was not able to obtain playing time he moved to and played for Lugano for a few months. 

Chloupek then rejoined FC Basel's first team in the Autumn of 1933. He played his domestic league debut for the club in the home game on 26 November 1933 as Basel won 5–1 against Blue Stars Zürich. He scored his only goal for his club on 7 April 1934 in the test game at the Landhof against VfB Leipzig as Basel were defeated 1–7.

In the Basel season 1933–34 Chloupek played a total of 25 games for Basel. 18 of these games were in the Swiss Serie A, two in the Swiss Cup and five were friendly games.

After this season Chloupek moved onto Olympique Marseille for one season before returning home to play another year for Floridsdorfer AC. He then played two seasons for Wiener SC and finally moved onto SK Dürnkrut, where he ended his active football.

References

Sources
 Rotblau: Jahrbuch Saison 2017/2018. Publisher: FC Basel Marketing AG. 
 Die ersten 125 Jahre. Publisher: Josef Zindel im Friedrich Reinhardt Verlag, Basel. 
 Verein "Basler Fussballarchiv" Homepage

Floridsdorfer AC players
FC Basel players
FC Lugano players
FC Zürich players
Olympique de Marseille players
Wiener Sport-Club players
Austrian footballers
Association football defenders
1908 births
1974 deaths